Darbeh-ye Gharibi (also Romanized as Darbeh-ye Gharībī; also known as Darb-e Gharībī) is a village in Donbaleh Rud-e Jonubi Rural District, Dehdez District, Izeh County, Khuzestan Province, Iran. At the 2006 census, its population was 554, in 103 families.

References 

Populated places in Izeh County